Good Bad Boys is a 1940 Our Gang short comedy film directed by Edward Cahn. It was the 192nd Our Gang short released (193rd episode, 104th talking short, 105th talking episode, and 24th MGM produced episode).

Plot
Slicker steals an orange from a fruit stand, and Alfalfa is wrongfully accused and punished for it. An angry Alfalfa decides to get even with his parents by embarking upon a life of crime. To that end, he enlists the other kids as his "mob." Hoping to deflect his pals from this drastic action, Spanky decides to teach the gang a lesson. He tricks the kids into thinking they have been burglarizing a house, when in fact they are merely helping their neighbor Mrs. Wilson clean out her junk.

Things take an unexpected turn when a real-life fugitive from justice chooses the gang's clubhouse as his hideout, with the cops hot on his heels. Assuming the police are after them, Alfalfa and the gang confess to their "crime," not knowing what the real crime committed by the real criminal was. The next morning they are arraigned and Spanky comes in with Mrs. Wilson to explain what had really happened. Meanwhile, Slicker is being arraigned with his mother for what seems to be an unrelated crime.

Cast

The Gang
 Mickey Gubitosi as Mickey
 George McFarland as Spanky
 Carl Switzer as Alfalfa
 Billie Thomas as Buckwheat
 Leonard Landy as Leonard

Additional cast
 Freddie Walburn as Slicker
 Hugh Beaumont as Judge's assistant
 Barbara Bedford as Alfalfa's mother
 Margaret Bert as Slicker's mother
 Byron Foulger as Store owner, Mr. Stephens
 George Lessey as Judge Kincaid
 Al Hill as Burglar
 Liela McIntyre as Mrs. Wilson
 Roger Moore as Court Official (as Joe Young)
 William Newell as Alfalfa's father
 Harry Strang as Banker
 Emmett Vogan as Police officer

See also
 Our Gang filmography

References

External links
 
 
 

1940 films
American black-and-white films
Films directed by Edward L. Cahn
Metro-Goldwyn-Mayer short films
1940 comedy films
Our Gang films
1940 short films
1940s American films